William John Horrocks (18 June 1905 – 15 November 1985) was an English cricketer active from 1926 to 1937 who played for Western Australia and Lancashire. He was born in Warrington and died in Melbourne. He appeared in 29 first-class matches as a righthanded batsman, scoring 1,255 runs with a highest score of 148* among three centuries and held nine catches.

See also
 List of Western Australia first-class cricketers

References

1905 births
1985 deaths
Cricketers from Warrington
English cricketers
Lancashire cricketers
Western Australia cricketers